Edward Hull (27 November 1879 – 3 April 1947) was a Jamaican cricketer. He played in nine first-class matches for the Jamaican cricket team from 1901 to 1911.

See also
 List of Jamaican representative cricketers

References

External links
 

1879 births
1947 deaths
Jamaican cricketers
Jamaica cricketers
Cricketers from Kingston, Jamaica